Jeanne Chevalier (March 19, 1892 – December 8, 1984) was a Canadian figure skater who competed in both single skating and pair skating. Her pairs partner was Norman M. Scott. As a single skater, she is the 1920 and 1921 Canadian champion. She and Scott won the 1914 Canadian pairs title. Chevalier was part of the four teams that won the Canadian fours championships in 1910, 1920 and 1921.

She also competed in the United States and won the first United States Figure Skating Championships in pairs.

Results
ladies' singles

pairs with Scott

References
 
   
Canadian Championships historical results, 1905-2006 (PDF)

Canadian female single skaters
Canadian female pair skaters
1892 births
1984 deaths